The 1951 All-Southwest Conference football team consists of American football players chosen by various organizations for All-Southwest Conference teams for the 1950 college football season.  The selectors for the 1951 season included the Associated Press (AP) and the United Press (UP).  Players selected as first-team players by both the AP and UP are designated in bold.

Offensive selections

Backs
 Larry Isbell, Baylor (AP-1)
 Gib Dawson, Texas (AP-1)
 Lamar McHam, Arkansas (AP-1)
 Ray McKowan, Texas Christian (AP-1)

Ends
 Bill Howton, Rice (AP-1)
 Stanley Williams, Baylor (AP-1)

Tackles
 Jack Little, Texas A&M (AP-1)
 Dave Hanner, Arkansas (AP-1)

Guards
 Harley Sewell, Texas (AP-1)
 Herschel Forester, Southern Methodist (AP-1)

Centers
 Hugh Meyer, Texas A&M (AP-1)

Defensive selections

Defensive ends
 Bill Howton, Rice (AP-1)
 Paul Williams, Texas (AP-1)

Defensive tackles
 Bill Forester, Southern Methodist (AP-1)
 Bob Griffin, Arkansas (AP-1)

Defensive guards
 Bill Athey, Baylor (AP-1)
 Herb Zimmerman, Texas Christian (AP-1)

Linebackers
 Keith Flowers, Texas Christian (AP-1)
 Dick Hightower, Southern Methodist (AP-1)

Defensive backs
 Bobby Dillon, Texas (AP-1)
 Yale Lary, Texas A&M (AP-1)
 Bill Burkhalter, Rice (AP-1)

Key
AP = Associated Press, "selected for the Associated Press by the seven coaches"

UP = United Press

Bold = Consensus first-team selection of both the AP and UP

See also
1951 College Football All-America Team

References

All-Southwest Conference
All-Southwest Conference football teams